Jahai may refer to:
 Jahai people, an indigenous Orang Asli people in Malaysia
 Jahai language, a part of the Jahaic languages spoken in Malaysia
 Jahaic languages, a group of northern Aslian language spoken in the Malay Peninsula region